Dianovka is a rural locality (a settlement) in Kozlovsky Selsoviet of Volodarsky District, Astrakhan Oblast, Russia. The population was 98 as of 2010. There are 3 streets.

Geography 
Dianovka is located 6 km northeast of Volodarsky (the district's administrative centre) by road. Kozlovo is the nearest rural locality.

References 

Rural localities in Volodarsky District, Astrakhan Oblast